Red Televisiva Megavisión (MEGA) is a Chilean private television network headquartered in Santiago. It currently airs on digital frequency channel 27 (ISDB-Tb) for HDTV. In 2012, ownership of Mega channel was transferred from Claro Group to Bethia Group. In June 2016, Discovery Inc. acquired 27.5% of Mega channel for close to $40 million. According to a report from Diario Financiero, the area responsible for the sales of Warner Bros. Discovery pay television channels in Mega Media was closed on December 30, 2022, thus marking the end of the ownership, commercial and of Mega's strategic alliance with its former minority investor since 2016.

History
Mega began broadcasting on 23 October 1990. It was originally named Red Televisiva Megavisión before changing its name in 2001. It is the first private broadcaster in Chile.

Programming
Among the many TV shows broadcast on MEGA are:

 Más Vale Tarde (Late night Talk show)
 Morandé con Compañía (variety show)
 Mucho gusto (breakfast television)
 Meganoticias (Daily News brand)
 Megadeportes (Daily Sports brand) 
 El Tiempo en Mega (Climate show)
 Verdades Ocultas. (Soap Opera)
 Yo soy Lorenzo. (Soap Opera)
 100 dias para enamorarse.(TV Series)

Slogans
 1990-1991: El otro canal (The other channel)
 1991-1992: Megavisión, estamos con usted (Megavision, we are with you)
 1992-2001: Megavisión, mucho que ver (Megavision, much to see.)
 2001-2010: Mega, ¡Se Vive! (Mega, It lives!.)
 2010-2013: Mega, ¡me gusta! (Mega, I like it!)
 2013-2015: Mega, cambia contigo (Mega, changes with you.)
 2015-2018: Mi Mega (My Mega)
 2018-2020: Tú nos inspiras (You inspire us)
2020–present: Comparte (Share it)

Logos

See also
 TVN
 Canal 13
 Chilevisión

References

External links
 Official Site 
 El "aterrizaje" de Bethia en Mega: Los primeros pasos del nuevo controlador / The "landing" of Bethia in Mega: The first steps of the new controller 

 
1990 establishments in Chile
Television networks in Chile
Companies based in Santiago
Mass media in Santiago
Spanish-language television stations
Television stations in Chile
Television channels and stations established in 1990